WEBZ (99.3 FM) is a commercial urban adult contemporary radio station located in Mexico Beach, Florida (Panama City metro). The station is owned by iHeartMedia.

External links
Official Website

EBZ
Urban adult contemporary radio stations in the United States
Radio stations established in 1990
IHeartMedia radio stations
1990 establishments in Florida